Gezeiten (German for Tide) is the sixth studio album from Austrian electronic music band L'Âme Immortelle. The three singles, "Fallen Angel", "5  Jahre" and "Stumme Schreie", are some of their most popular songs. Released in 2004, this was the first album to come out after the band switched labels to Supersonic/GUN.

Track listing

Singles
2004 – "5 Jahre"
2005 – "Stumme Schreie"
2006 – "Fallen Angel"

Videos
"Fallen Angel"
"5 Jahre"
"Stumme Schreie"

References 

2004 albums
GUN Records albums
Albums produced by Rhys Fulber